State Route 2C was the former designation for an unimproved road between Yerington and SR 3 (now US 95) south of Schurz. 

It was commissioned in 1937. It was decommissioned in 1972.

References 

002C